A.P.C. Mahalaxmi College for Women, is a women's general degree college located in Thoothukudi, Thoothukudi district, Tamil Nadu. It was established in the year 1973. The college is affiliated with Manonmaniam Sundaranar University. This college offers different courses in arts, commerce and science.

Departments

Science
Physics
Chemistry
Mathematics
Zoology
Physics
Computer Science

Arts and Commerce
Tamil
English
History
Commerce

Accreditation
The college is  recognized by the University Grants Commission (UGC).

References

External links
http://www.apcmcollege.ac.in

Educational institutions established in 1973
1973 establishments in Tamil Nadu
Colleges affiliated to Manonmaniam Sundaranar University
Universities and colleges in Thoothukudi district